Ælfflæd is a name of Anglo-Saxon England meaning Ælf (Elf) and flæd (beauty). It may refer to:

 Saint Ælfflæd of Whitby (654–714)
 Ælfflæd of Mercia, daughter of Offa, wife of King Æthelred I of Northumbria
 Ælfflæd, wife of Edward the Elder, mother of Ælfweard and Edwin
 Ælfflæd, daughter of Edgar the Peaceful  
 Aelfled of Bernicia
 Ælfflæd of Mercia (II), daughter of Ceolwulf I of Mercia, wife of Wigmund of Mercia, mother of Wigstan of Mercia

See also
 Æthelflæd (name)

References